A beard is the hair that grows on the jaw, chin, upper lip, lower lip, cheeks, and neck of humans and some non-human animals. In humans, usually pubescent or adult males are able to start growing beards, on average at the age of 21.

Throughout the course of history, societal attitudes toward male beards have varied widely depending on factors such as prevailing cultural-religious traditions and the current era's fashion trends. Some religions (such as some sects of Islam, and Sikhism) have considered a full beard to be essential and mandate it as part of their observance. Other cultures, even while not officially mandating it, view a beard as central to a man's virility, exemplifying such virtues as wisdom, strength, sexual prowess and high social status. In cultures where facial hair is uncommon (or currently out of fashion), beards may be associated with poor hygiene or an unconventional demeanor. In countries with colder climates, beards help protect the wearer's face from the elements. Beards also provide sun protection.

Biology
The beard develops during puberty. Beard growth is linked to stimulation of hair follicles in the area by dihydrotestosterone, which continues to affect beard growth after puberty. Dihydrotestosterone also promotes balding. Dihydrotestosterone is produced from testosterone, the levels of which vary with season. Beard growth rate is also genetic.

Evolution

Biologists characterize beards as a secondary sexual characteristic because they are unique to one sex, yet do not play a direct role in reproduction. Charles Darwin first suggested a possible evolutionary explanation of beards in his work The Descent of Man, which hypothesized that the process of sexual selection may have led to beards. Modern biologists have reaffirmed the role of sexual selection in the evolution of beards, concluding that there is evidence that a majority of women find men with beards more attractive than men without beards.

Evolutionary psychology explanations for the existence of beards include signalling sexual maturity and signalling dominance by the increasing perceived size of jaws; clean-shaved faces are rated less dominant than bearded. Some scholars assert that it is not yet established whether the sexual selection leading to beards is rooted in attractiveness (inter-sexual selection) or dominance (intra-sexual selection). A beard can be explained as an indicator of a male's overall condition. The rate of facial hairiness appears to influence male attractiveness. The presence of a beard makes the male vulnerable in hand-to-hand fights (it provides an easy way to grab and hold the opponent's head), which is costly, so biologists have speculated that there must be other evolutionary benefits that outweigh that drawback. Excess testosterone evidenced by the beard may indicate mild immunosuppression, which may support spermatogenesis.

Styles

Beard hair is most commonly removed by shaving or by trimming with the use of a beard trimmer. If only the area above the upper lip is left unshaven, the resulting facial hairstyle is known as a mustache; if hair is left only on the chin, the style is a goatee.

 Full: downward flowing beard with either a styled or integrated mustache
 Garibaldi: wide, full beard with rounded bottom and integrated mustache
 Old Dutch: A large, long beard, connected by sideburns, that flares outward in width at the bottom, without a mustache.
 Sideburns: hair grown from the temples down the cheeks toward the jawline. Worn by Ambrose Burnside (the namesake of the style), Isaac Asimov and Carlos Menem.
 Jawline beard: A beard that is grown from the chin along the jawline. Chinstrap, chin curtain and brett are all variations of a jawline beard with distinctions being chin coverage and sideburn length.
 Chinstrap: a beard with long sideburns that comes forward and ends under the chin.
 Chin curtain: similar to the chinstrap beard but covers the entire chin. Also called a Lincoln, Shenandoah, or spade.
 Brett: similar to the chin curtain beard, but does not connect to the sideburns.
 Neckbeard (a.k.a. Neard, a portmanteau of "neck" and "beard"): similar to the chinstrap, but with the chin and jawline shaven, leaving hair to grow only on the neck. While never as popular as other beard styles, a few noted historical figures have worn this type of beard, such as Nero, Horace Greeley, Henry David Thoreau, William Empson, Peter Cooper,  Moses Mendelssohn, Richard Wagner, and Michael Costa.
 Circle beard: Commonly mistaken for the goatee, the circle beard is a small chin beard that connects around the mouth to a mustache. Also called a doorknocker.
 Designer stubble: A short growth of the male beard that was popular in the West in the 1980s, and experienced a resurgence in popularity in the 2010s.
 Sea captain: A rounded, bottom-heavy beard of medium length with short sides that is often paired with a longer mustache.
 Goatee: A tuft of hair grown on the chin, sometimes resembling a billy goat's.
 Junco: A goatee that extends upward and connects to the corners of the mouth but does not include a mustache, like the circle beard.
 Meg: A goatee that extends upward and connects to the mustache, this word is commonly used in the south east of Ireland.
 Van Dyke: a goatee accompanied by a mustache.
 Monkey tail: a Van Dyke as viewed from one side, and a Lincoln plus mustache as viewed from the other, giving the impression that a monkey's tail stretches from an ear down to the chin and around one's mouth.
 Hollywoodian: a beard with an integrated mustache that is worn on the lower part of the chin and jaw area, without connecting sideburns.
 Reed: a beard with an integrated mustache that is worn on the lower part of the chin and jaw area that tapers towards the ears without connecting sideburns.
 Royale: a narrow pointed beard extending from the chin. The style was popular in France during the period of the Second Empire, from which it gets its alternative name, the imperial or impériale.
 Verdi: a short beard with a rounded bottom and slightly shaven cheeks with a prominent mustache
 Muslim beard: Full beard with the mustache trimmed
 Soul patch: a small beard just below the lower lip and above the chin
 Glitter beard: Beard dipped in glitter.
 Hulihee: clean-shaven chin with fat chops connected at the mustache.
 Friendly mutton chops: long mutton chop-type sideburns connected to a mustache, but with a shaved chin and neck.
 Stashburns or the Lemmy: sideburns that drop down the jaw but jut upwards across the mustache, leaving the chin exposed. Similar to friendly mutton chops. Often found in southern and southwestern American culture (see, for example, the Yosemite Sam caricature).
Closed or Tied beard: Mostly seen among modern Sikh youth, this is a kind of full beard tied by using a sticky liquid or Gel and stiffens below the chin. 
 Oakley beard: Described by Indian makeup artist Banu as "neither a French beard nor a full beard". She used the look for Rajinikanth in Enthiran (2010).

Maintenance
For appearance and cleanliness, some people maintain their beards by exfoliating the skin, using soap or shampoo and sometimes conditioner, and afterward applying oils for softness.

History

Ancient and classical world

Lebanon

The ancient Semitic civilization situated on the western, coastal part of the Fertile Crescent and centered on the coastline of modern Lebanon gave great attention to the hair and beard. Where the beard has mostly a strong resemblance to that affected by the Assyrians, and familiar to us from their sculptures. It is arranged in three, four, or five rows of small tight curls, and extends from ear to ear around the cheeks and chin. Sometimes, however, in lieu of the many rows, we find one row only, the beard falling in tresses, which are curled at the extremity. There is no indication of the Phoenicians having cultivated mustachios.

Israel

Israelite society placed a special importance on the beard. Many religious male figures are recorded to have had facial hair; for example, numerous prophets mentioned in the Tanakh were known to grow beards. The Torah forbids certain shaving practices altogether, in particular Leviticus 19:27 states, "You shall not round off the side-growth on your head, or destroy the side-growth of your beard." The Mishnah interprets this as a prohibition on using a razor on the beard. This prohibition is further expanded upon in kabbalistic literature. The prohibition carries to modern Judaism to this day, with rabbinic opinion forbidding the use of a razor to shave between the "five corners of the beard" – although there is no uniform consensus on where these five vertices are located.

According to biblical scholars, the shaving of hair, particularly of the corners of the beard, was originally a mourning custom; the behaviour appears, from the Book of Jeremiah, to also have been practiced by other Semitic tribes, although some ancient manuscripts of the text read live in remote places rather than clip the corners of their hair. Biblical scholars think that the regulations against shaving hair may be an attack on the practice of offering hair to the dead, which was performed in the belief that it would obtain protection in sheol. The prohibition may also have been an attempt to distinguish the appearance of Israelites from that of the surrounding nations, and likewise reduce the influence of foreign religions;  The Hittites and Elamites were clean-shaven, and the Sumerians were also frequently without a beard; conversely, the Egyptians and Libyans shaved the beard into very stylised elongated goatees. Maimonides criticises the shaving of the beard as being the custom of idolatrous priests.

Mesopotamia

Mesopotamian civilizations (Sumerian, Assyrians, Babylonians, Chaldeans and Medians) devoted great care to oiling and dressing their beards, using tongs and curling irons to create elaborate ringlets and tiered patterns.

Egypt
The highest ranking Ancient Egyptians grew hair on their chins which was often dyed a reddish orange with henna and sometimes plaited with an interwoven gold thread. A metal false beard, or postiche, which was a sign of sovereignty, was worn by queens and kings.

Indian subcontinent
In ancient India, the beard was allowed to grow long, a symbol of dignity and of wisdom (cf. sadhu). The nations in the east generally treated their beards with great care and veneration, and the punishment for licentiousness and adultery was to have the beard of the offending parties publicly cut off. They had such a sacred regard for the preservation of their beards that a man might pledge it for the payment of a debt.

China 

Confucius held that the human body was a gift from one's parents to which no alterations should be made. Aside from abstaining from body modifications such as tattoos, Confucians were also discouraged from cutting their hair, fingernails or beards. To what extent people could actually comply with this ideal depended on their profession; farmers or soldiers could probably not grow long beards as it would have interfered with their work.

This growth pattern can be seen on the clay soldiers in the Terracotta Army.

Iran
The Iranians were fond of long beards, and almost all the Iranian kings had a beard. In Travels by Adam Olearius, a King of Iran commands his steward's head to be cut off, and on its being brought to him, remarks, "what a pity it was, that a man possessing such fine mustachios, should have been executed." Men in the Achaemenid era wore long beards, with warriors adorning theirs with jewelry. Men also commonly wore beards during the Safavid and Qajar eras.

Greece

The ancient Greeks regarded the beard as a badge or sign of virility; in the Homeric epics it had almost sanctified significance, so that a common form of entreaty was to touch the beard of the person addressed. According to William Smith in these ancient times the moustache was shaven, leaving clear the space around the lips. It was only shaven as a sign of mourning, though in this case it was instead often left untrimmed. A smooth face was regarded as a sign of effeminacy. The Spartans punished cowards by shaving off a portion of their beards. Greek beards were also frequently curled with tongs.

In Ancient Macedonia, during the time of Alexander the Great the custom of smooth shaving was introduced. Alexander strongly promoted shaving during his reign because he believed it looked tidier. Reportedly, Alexander ordered his soldiers to be clean-shaven, fearing that their beards would serve as handles for their enemies to grab and hold onto. The practice of shaving spread from the Macedonians, whose kings are represented on coins, statues, etc. with smooth faces, throughout the whole known world of the Macedonian Empire. Laws were passed against it, without effect, at Rhodes and Byzantium; even Aristotle conformed to the new custom, unlike the other philosophers, who retained the beard as a badge of their profession. Due to this, a man with a beard, after the Macedonian period, implied a philosopher; there are many allusions to this custom of the later philosophers in such proverbs as: "The beard does not make the sage." Due to this association with philosophers, who lost reputation over time, the beard acquired more and more a negative connotation, as in Theodore Prodromos, Lucian of Samosata and Julian the apostate (who wrote the Misopogon, i. e. "beard hater")

Rome
Shaving seems to have not been known to the Romans during their early history (under the kings of Rome and the early Republic). Pliny tells us that P. Ticinius was the first who brought a barber to Rome, which was in the 454th year from the founding of the city (that is, around ). Scipio Africanus was apparently the first among the Romans who shaved his beard. However, after that point, shaving seems to have caught on very quickly, and soon almost all Roman men were clean-shaven; being clean-shaven became a sign of being Roman and not Greek. Only in the later times of the Republic did the Roman youth begin shaving their beards only partially, trimming it into an ornamental form; prepubescent boys oiled their chins in hopes of forcing premature growth of a beard.

Still, beards remained rare among the Romans throughout the Late Republic and the early Principate. In a general way, in Rome at this time, a long beard was considered a mark of slovenliness and squalor. The censors L. Veturius and P. Licinius compelled M. Livius, who had been banished, on his restoration to the city, to be shaved, to lay aside his dirty appearance, and then, but not until then, to come into the Senate. The first occasion of shaving was regarded as the beginning of manhood, and the day on which this took place was celebrated as a festival. Usually, this was done when the young Roman assumed the toga virilis. Augustus did it in his twenty-fourth year, Caligula in his twentieth. The hair cut off on such occasions was consecrated to a god. Thus Nero put his into a golden box set with pearls, and dedicated it to Jupiter Capitolinus. The Romans, unlike the Greeks, let their beards grow in time of mourning; so did Augustus for the death of Julius Caesar. Other occasions of mourning on which the beard was allowed to grow were, appearance as a reus, condemnation, or some public calamity. On the other hand, men of the country areas around Rome in the time of Varro seem not to have shaved except when they came to market every eighth day, so that their usual appearance was most likely a short stubble.

In the  the Emperor Hadrian (r. 117 - 138), according to Dio Cassius, was the first emperor to grow a full beard; Plutarch says that he did it to hide scars on his face. This was a period in Rome of widespread imitation of Greek culture, and many other men grew beards in imitation of Hadrian and the Greek fashion. Until the time of Constantine the Great (r. 306 - 337) all adult emperors appear in busts and coins with beards; but Constantine and his successors until the reign of Phocas (r. 602 - 610), with the exception of Julian the Apostate (r. 361 - 363), are represented as beardless.

The "philosopher's beard"
In Greco-Roman antiquity the beard was "seen as the defining characteristic of the philosopher; philosophers had to have beards, and anyone with a beard was assumed to be a philosopher." While one may be tempted to think that Socrates and Plato sported "philosopher's beards", such is not the case. 
Shaving was not widespread in Athens during fifth and fourth-century BCE and so they would not be distinguished from the general populace for having a beard. The popularity of shaving did not rise in the region until the example of Alexander the Great near the end of the fourth century BCE. The popularity of shaving did not spread to Rome until the end of the third century BCE following its acceptance by Scipio Africanus. In Rome shaving's popularity grew to the point that for a respectable Roman citizen, it was seen almost as compulsory.

The idea of the philosopher's beard gained traction when in 155 BCE three philosophers arrived in Rome as Greek diplomats: Carneades, head of the Platonic Academy; Critolaus of Aristotle's Lyceum; and the head of the Stoics, Diogenes of Babylon. "In contrast to their beautifully clean-shaven Italian audience, these three intellectuals all sported magnificent beards." Thus the connection of beards and philosophy caught hold of the Roman public imagination.

The importance of the beard to Roman philosophers is best seen by the extreme value that the Stoic philosopher Epictetus placed on it. As historian John Sellars puts it, Epictetus "affirmed the philosopher's beard as something almost sacred...to express the idea that philosophy is no mere intellectual hobby but rather a way of life that, by definition, transforms every aspect of one's behavior, including one's shaving habits. If someone continues to shave in order to look the part of a respectable Roman citizen, it is clear that they have not yet embraced philosophy conceived as a way of life and have not yet escaped the social customs of the majority...the true philosopher will only act according to reason or according to nature, rejecting the arbitrary conventions that guide the behavior of everyone else."

Epictetus saw his beard as an integral part of his identity and held that he would rather be executed than submit to any force demanding he remove it. In his Discourses 1.2.29, he puts forward such a hypothetical confrontation: Come now, Epictetus, shave your beard'. If I am a philosopher, I answer, I will not shave it off. 'Then I will have you beheaded'. If it will do you any good, behead me." The act of shaving "would be to compromise his philosophical ideal of living in accordance with nature and it would be to submit to the unjustified authority of another."

This was not theoretical in the age of Epictetus, for the Emperor Domitian had the hair and beard forcibly shaven off of the philosopher Apollonius of Tyana "as punishment for anti-State activities." This disgraced Apollonius while avoiding making him a martyr like Socrates. Well before his declaration of "death before shaving" Epictetus had been forced to flee Rome when Domitian banished all philosophers from Italy under threat of execution.

Roman philosophers sported different styles of beards to distinguish which school they belonged to. Cynics with long dirty beards to indicate their "strict indifference to all external goods and social customs"; Stoics occasionally trimming and washing their beards in accordance with their view "that it is acceptable to prefer certain external goods so long as they are never valued above virtue"; Peripatetics took great care of their beards believing in accordance with Aristotle that "external goods and social status were necessary for the good life together with virtue". To a Roman philosopher in this era, having a beard and its condition indicated their commitment to live in accordance with their philosophy.

Celts and Germanic tribes

Late Hellenistic sculptures of Celts portray them with long hair and mustaches but beardless. Caesar reported the Britons wore no beard except upon the upper lip.

The Anglo-Saxons on arrival in Great Britain wore beards and continued to do so for a considerable time after. Among the Gaelic Celts of Scotland and Ireland, men typically let their facial hair grow into a full beard, and it was often seen as dishonourable for a Gaelic man to have no facial hair.

Tacitus states that among the Catti, a Germanic tribe (perhaps the Chatten), a young man was not allowed to shave or cut his hair until he had slain an enemy. The Lombards derived their name from the great length of their beards (Longobards – Long Beards). When Otto the Great said anything serious, he swore by his beard, which covered his breast.

Middle Ages
In Medieval Europe, a beard displayed a knight's virility and honour.
The Castilian knight El Cid is described in The Lay of the Cid as "the one with the flowery beard".
Holding somebody else's beard was a serious offence that had to be righted in a duel.

While most noblemen and knights were bearded, the Catholic clergy were generally required to be clean-shaven. This was understood as a symbol of their celibacy.

In pre-Islamic Arabia, Arabian men would apparently shorten their beards and keep big mustachios. Muhammad encouraged his followers to do the opposite, to grow their beards and trim their moustaches, to differ with the non-believers. This style of beard subsequently spread along with Islam during the Muslim expansion in the Middle Ages.

From the Renaissance to the present day

Most Chinese emperors of the Ming dynasty (1368–1644) appear with beards or mustaches in portraits.

In the 15th century, most European men were clean-shaven. 16th-century beards were allowed to grow to an amazing length (see the portraits of John Knox, Bishop Gardiner, Cardinal Pole and Thomas Cranmer). Some beards of this time were the Spanish spade beard, the English square cut beard, the forked beard, and the stiletto beard. In 1587 Francis Drake claimed, in a figure of speech, to have singed the King of Spain's beard.

During the Chinese Qing dynasty (1644–1911), the ruling Manchu minority were either clean-shaven or at most wore mustaches, in contrast to the Han majority who still wore beards in keeping with the Confucian ideal.

In the beginning of the 17th century, the size of beards decreased in urban circles of Western Europe and by the middle of the century men usually wore a mustache or, at most, a pointed goatee. In the second half of the century, being clean-shaven gradually became more common again, so much so that in 1698, Peter the Great of Russia ordered men to shave off their beards, and in 1705 levied a tax on beards in order to bring Russian society more in line with contemporary Western Europe. Throughout the 18th century essentially all upper class and most middle class European men would be clean shaven.

At the end of the 18th century, after the French Revolution, attitudes began to turn away from the upper class fashions of the previous century particularly among the middle classes. During the early 19th century most men, particularly amongst the nobility and upper classes, went clean-shaven. However the revolutionary fashion of France which had become popular among the lower and middle classes began to creep its way into the upper class as well. This is seen in the 1820s and 1830s with many men adopting sideburns or side whiskers which gradually grew in size in the ensuing decades. This was followed by a dramatic shift in the beard's popularity during the 1850s, with it becoming markedly more popular. Consequently, beards were adopted by many leaders, such as Alexander III of Russia, Napoleon III of France and Frederick III of Germany, as well as many leading statesmen and cultural figures, such as Benjamin Disraeli, Charles Dickens, Giuseppe Garibaldi, Karl Marx, and Giuseppe Verdi. This trend can be recognised in the United States of America, where the shift can be seen amongst the post-Civil War presidents. Before Abraham Lincoln, no President had a beard; after Lincoln until Woodrow Wilson, every President except Andrew Johnson and William McKinley had either a beard or a moustache.

The beard became linked in this period with notions of masculinity and male courage. The resulting popularity has contributed to the stereotypical Victorian male figure in the popular mind, the stern figure clothed in black whose gravitas is added to by a heavy beard. 

In China, the revolution of 1911 and subsequent May Fourth Movement of 1919 led the Chinese to idealize the West as more modern and progressive than themselves. This included the realm of fashion, and Chinese men began shaving their faces and cutting their hair short.

By the early-twentieth century, beards began a slow decline in popularity. Although retained by some prominent figures who were young men in the Victorian period (like Sigmund Freud), most men who retained facial hair during the 1920s and 1930s limited themselves to a moustache or a goatee (such as with Marcel Proust, Albert Einstein, Vladimir Lenin, Leon Trotsky, Adolf Hitler, and Joseph Stalin). In the United States, meanwhile, popular movies portrayed heroes with clean-shaven faces and "crew cuts". Concurrently, the psychological mass marketing of Edward Bernays and Madison Avenue was becoming prevalent. The Gillette Safety Razor Company was one of these marketers' early clients. These events conspired to popularize short hair and clean-shaven faces as the only acceptable style for decades to come. The few men who wore the beard or portions of the beard during this period were usually either old, Central European, members of a religious sect that required it, or in academia.

The beard was reintroduced to mainstream society by the counterculture, firstly with the "beatniks" in the 1950s, and then with the hippie movement of the mid-1960s. Following the Vietnam War, beards exploded in popularity. In the mid-late 1960s and throughout the 1970s, beards were worn by hippies and businessmen alike. Popular musicians like The Beatles, Barry White, The Beach Boys, Jim Morrison (lead singer of The Doors) and the male members of Peter, Paul, and Mary, among many others, wore full beards. The trend of seemingly ubiquitous beards in American culture subsided in the mid-1980s.

By the end of the 20th century, the closely clipped Verdi beard, often with a matching integrated moustache, had become relatively common. From the 1990s onward, fashion in the United States has generally trended toward either a goatee, Van Dyke, or a closely cropped full beard undercut on the throat. By 2010, the fashionable length approached a "two-day shadow". The 2010s decade also saw the full beard become fashionable again amongst young hipster men and a huge increase in the sales of male grooming products.

One stratum of American society where facial hair was long rare is in government and politics. The last President of the United States to wear any type of facial hair was William Howard Taft, who was in office from 1909 to 1913. The last Vice President of the United States to wear any facial hair was Charles Curtis, who was in office from 1929 to 1933. Both of whom wore moustaches, but the last President of the United States to wear a beard was Benjamin Harrison; who was in office from 1889 to 1893. The last member of the United States Supreme Court with a full beard was Chief Justice Charles Evans Hughes, who served on the Court until 1941. Since 2015 a growing number of male political figures have worn beards in office, including Speaker of the House Paul Ryan, and Senators Ted Cruz and Tom Cotton.

In religion
Beards also play an important role in some religions.

In Greek mythology and art, Zeus and Poseidon are always portrayed with beards, but Apollo never is. Zoroaster, the ancient founder of Zoroastrianism is almost always depicted with a beard.
In Norse mythology, Thor the god of thunder is portrayed wearing a red beard.

Christianity

Iconography and art dating from the 4th century onward almost always portray Jesus with a beard. In paintings and statues most of the Old Testament Biblical characters such as Moses and Abraham and Jesus' New Testament disciples such as St Peter appear with beards, as does John the Baptist. However, Western European art generally depicts John the Apostle as clean-shaven, to emphasize his relative youth. Eight of the figures portrayed in the painting entitled The Last Supper by Leonardo da Vinci are bearded. Mainstream Christianity holds Isaiah Chapter 50: Verse 6 as a prophecy of Christ's crucifixion, and as such, as a description of Christ having his beard plucked by his tormentors.

Eastern Christianity

In Eastern Christianity, members of the priesthood and monastics often wear beards, and religious authorities at times have recommended or required beards for all male believers.

Traditionally, Syrian Christians from Kerala wear long beards. Syrian Christian Priests and Monastics are obliged to wear beards.

In the 1160s Burchardus, abbot of the Cistercian monastery of Bellevaux in the Franche-Comté, wrote a treatise on beards. He regarded beards as appropriate for lay brothers, but not for the priests among the monks.

Western Christianity
At various times in its history and depending on various circumstances, the Catholic Church in the West permitted or prohibited facial hair (barbae nutritio – literally meaning "nourishing a beard") for clergy. A decree of the beginning of the 6th century in either Carthage or the south of Gaul forbade clerics to let their hair and beards grow freely. The phrase "nourishing a beard" was interpreted in different ways, either as imposing a clean-shaven face or only excluding a too-lengthy beard. In relatively modern times, the first pope to wear a beard was Pope Julius II, who in 1511–12 did so for a while as a sign of mourning for the loss of the city of Bologna. Pope Clement VII let his beard grow at the time of the Sack of Rome (1527) and kept it. All his successors did so until the death in 1700 of Pope Innocent XII. Since then, no pope has worn a beard.

Beards have been associated at different dates with particular Catholic religious orders. In about 1240, Alberic of Trois-Fontaines described the Knights Templar as an "order of bearded brethren"; and, on the eve of the suppression of the order in 1312, out of nearly 230 knights and brothers questioned by the papal commissioners in Paris, 76 are described as wearing a beard (in some cases specified as "in the style of the Templars"), while another 133 are reported to have shaved their beards, either in renunciation of their vows or in a bid to escape detection. Randle Holme, writing in 1688, associated beards with Templars, Teutonic Knights, Austin Friars and Gregorians. Most Latin-rite clergy are now clean-shaven, but Capuchins and some others are bearded. Present Canon law is silent on the matter.

Although most Protestant Christians regard the beard as a matter of choice, some have taken the lead in fashion by openly encouraging its growth as "a habit most natural, scriptural, manly, and beneficial" (C. H. Spurgeon). Amish and Hutterite men shave until they marry, then grow a beard and are never thereafter without one, although it is a particular form of a beard (see Visual markers of marital status). Some Messianic Jews also wear beards to show their observance of the Old Testament.

Diarmaid MacCulloch, professor of history of the Church at University of Oxford, writes: "There is no doubt that Cranmer mourned the dead king (Henry VIII)", and it was said that he showed his grief by growing a beard. However, MacCulloch also states that during the Reformation Era, many Protestant Reformers decided to grow their beards in order to emphasize their break with the Catholic tradition:

The Church of Jesus Christ of Latter-day Saints

Since the mid-twentieth century, The Church of Jesus Christ of Latter-day Saints (LDS Church) has encouraged men to be clean-shaven, particularly those that serve in ecclesiastical leadership positions. The church's encouragement of men's shaving has no theological basis, but stems from the general waning of facial hair's popularity in Western society during the twentieth century and its association with the hippie and drug culture aspects of the counterculture of the 1960s, and has not been a permanent rule.

After Joseph Smith, many of the early presidents of the LDS Church, such as Brigham Young and Lorenzo Snow, wore large beards. Since David O. McKay became church president in 1951, most LDS Church leaders have been clean-shaven. The church maintains no formal policy on facial hair for its general membership. However, formal prohibitions against facial hair are currently enforced for young men providing two-year missionary service. Students and staff of the church-sponsored higher education institutions, such as Brigham Young University (BYU), are required to adhere to the Church Educational System Honor Code, which states in part: "Men are expected to be clean-shaven; beards are not acceptable", although male BYU students are permitted to wear a neatly groomed moustache. A beard exemption is granted for "serious skin conditions", and for approved theatrical performances, but until 2015 no exemption was given for any other reason, including religious convictions. In January 2015, BYU clarified that students who want a beard for religious reasons, like Muslims or Sikhs, may be granted permission after applying for an exemption.

BYU students led a campaign to loosen the beard restrictions in 2014, but it had the opposite effect at Church Educational System schools: some who had previously been granted beard exemptions were found no longer to qualify, and for a brief period the LDS Business College required students with a registered exemption to wear a "beard badge", which was likened to a "badge of shame". Some students also join in with shaming their fellow beard-wearing students, even those with registered exemptions.

Hinduism
The ancient Hindu texts regarding beards depends on the Deva and other teachings, varying according to whom the devotee worships or follows. Many Sadhus, Yogis, or Yoga practitioners keep beards, and represent all situations of life. Shaivite ascetics generally have beards, as they are not permitted to own anything, which would include a razor. The beard is also a sign of a nomadic and ascetic lifestyle.

Vaishnava men, typically of the ISKCON sect, are often clean-shaven as a sign of cleanliness.

Islam
In the Quran, Aaron is said to have had a beard (20:94). Muhammad sported a thick beard along with long head hair that reached his shoulders.

Sunni 

In Sunni Islamic jurisprudence there are three verdicts of the beard according to Islamic tradition.

The 1st verdict is that growing the beard is obligatory and that shaving it is haram (forbidden) with the main source for this position being this narration:
Sahih Bukhari, Book 72, Hadith #781 (USC-MSA) Narrated by Ibn 'Umar: Allah's Apostle said, "Cut the moustaches short and leave the beard (as it is)."

The 2nd opinion which is the official position of the Shafi'i school of thought, the beard is only mandoub (recommended) and shaving the beard is only disliked (makruh) but not haram (forbidden).

The 3rd opinion which is among contemporary scholars is that the beard is permissible and that shaving is also permissible.

The extent of the beard is from the cheekbones, level with the channel of the ears, until the bottom of the face. It includes the hair that grows on the cheeks. Hair on the neck is not considered a part of the beard and can be removed, According to the first opinion, which says that it is obligatory.

Shia
According to the Twelver Shia scholars, as per Sunnah, the length of a beard should not exceed the width of a fist. Trimming of facial hair is allowed; however, shaving it is haram (religiously forbidden). About the permissible size of it, according to Shia-Islam Marja's (among: Seyyed Ali Khamenei, Seyyed Ali Sistani, etc.): if this (its size) is Urfly applicable (true of) beard, it won't be haram.

Judaism

The Hebrew Bible states in Leviticus  that "You shall not round the corners of your heads, neither shalt thou mar the corners of thy beard." Talmudic tradition explains this to mean that a man may not shave his beard with a razor with a single blade, since the cutting action of the blade against the skin "mars" the beard. Because scissors have two blades, some opinions in halakha (Jewish law) permit their use to trim the beard, as the cutting action comes from contact of the two blades and not the blade against the skin. For this reason, some poskim (Jewish legal deciders) rule that Orthodox Jews may use electric razors to remain clean-shaven, as such shavers cut by trapping the hair between the blades and the metal grating, halakhically a scissorlike action. Other poskim like Zokon Yisrael KiHilchso, maintain that electric shavers constitute a razor-style action and consequently prohibit their use.

The Zohar, one of the primary sources of Kabbalah (Jewish mysticism), attributes Sacred to the beard, specifying that hairs of the beard symbolize channels of subconscious holy energy that flows from above to the human soul. Therefore, most Hasidic Jews, for whom Kabbalah plays an important role in their religious practice, traditionally do not remove or even trim their beards.

Traditional Jews refrain from shaving, trimming the beard, and haircuts during certain times of the year like Passover, Sukkot, the Counting of the Omer and the Three Weeks. Cutting the hair is also restricted during the 30-day mourning period after the death of a close relative, known in Hebrew as the Shloshim (thirty).

Sikhism

Guru Gobind Singh, the tenth Sikh Guru, commanded the Sikhs to maintain unshorn hair, recognizing it as a necessary adornment of the body by Almighty God as well as a mandatory Article of Faith. Sikhs consider the beard to be part of the nobility and dignity of their manhood. Sikhs also refrain from cutting their hair and beards out of respect for the God-given form. Kesh, uncut hair, is one of the Five Ks, five compulsory articles of faith for a baptized Sikh. As such, a Sikh man is easily identified by his turban and uncut hair and beard.

Rastafari Movement
Male Rastafarians wear beards in conformity with injunctions given in the Bible, such as Leviticus 21:5, which reads "They shall not make any baldness on their heads, nor shave off the edges of their beards, nor make any cuts in their flesh." The beard is a symbol of the covenant between God (Jah or Jehovah in Rastafari usage) and his people.

Buddhism
Buddhist monks shave both their scalp and facial hair, as part of Pabbajja.

Modern prohibition

Civilian prohibitions
Professional airline pilots are required to be shaven to facilitate a tight seal with auxiliary oxygen masks. However, some airlines have recently lifted such bans in light of modern studies. Similarly, firefighters may also be prohibited from full beards to obtain a proper seal with SCBA equipment. Other jobs may prohibit beards as necessary to wear masks or respirators.

Isezaki city in Gunma prefecture, Japan, decided to ban beards for male municipal employees on 19 May 2010.

The U.S. Court of Appeals for the Eighth Circuit has found requiring shaving to be discriminatory.

Sports
The International Boxing Association prohibits the wearing of beards by amateur boxers, although the Amateur Boxing Association of England allows exceptions for Sikh men, on condition that the beard be covered with a fine net.

The Cincinnati Reds baseball team had a longstanding enforced policy where all players had to be completely clean-shaven (no beards, long sideburns or moustaches). However, this policy was abolished following the sale of the team by Marge Schott in 1999.

Willie Randolph and Joe Girardi, both former Yankee assistant coaches, adopted a similar clean-shaven policy for their ballclubs: the New York Mets and Miami Marlins, respectively. Fredi Gonzalez, who replaced Girardi as the Marlins' manager, dropped that policy when he took over after the 2006 season.

The Playoff beard is a tradition common with teams in the National Hockey League, and now in other leagues where players allow their beards to grow from the beginning of the playoff season until the playoffs are over for their team.

In 2008, some members of the Tyrone Gaelic football team vowed not to shave until the end of the season. They went on to win the All-Ireland football championship, some of them sporting impressive beards by that stage.

Canadian Rugby Union flanker Adam Kleeberger attracted much media attention before, during, and after the 2011 Rugby World Cup in New Zealand. Kleeberger was known, alongside teammates Jebb Sinclair and Hubert Buydens as one of "the beardoes". Fans in the stands could often be seen wearing fake beards and "fear the beard" became a popular expression during the team's run in the competition. Kleeberger, who became one of Canada's star players in the tournament, later used the publicity surrounding his beard to raise awareness for two causes; Christchurch earthquake relief efforts and prostate cancer. As part of this fundraising, his beard was shaved off by television personality Rick Mercer and aired on national television. The "Fear the Beard" expression was coined by the NBA's Oklahoma City Thunder fans and was previously used by Houston Rockets fans to support James Harden.

San Francisco Giants relief pitcher Brian Wilson, who claims not to have shaved since the 2010 All-Star Game, has grown a big beard that has become popular in MLB and with its fans. MLB Fan Cave presented a "Journey Inside Brian Wilson's Beard", which was an interactive screenshot of Wilson's beard, where one can click on different sections to see various fictional activities performed by small "residents" of the beard. The hosts on sports show sometimes wear replica beards, and the Giants gave them away to fans as a promo.

The 2013 Boston Red Sox featured at least 12 players with varying degrees of facial hair, ranging from the closely trimmed beard of slugger David Ortiz to the long shaggy looks of Jonny Gomes and Mike Napoli. The Red Sox used their beards as a marketing tool, offering a Dollar Beard Night, where all fans with beards (real or fake) could buy a ticket for $1.00; and also as means of fostering team camaraderie.

Beards have also become a source of competition between athletes. Examples of athlete "beard-offs" include NBA players DeShawn Stevenson and Drew Gooden in 2008, and WWE wrestler Daniel Bryan and Oakland Athletics outfielder Josh Reddick in 2013.

Armed forces

Depending on the country and period, facial hair was either prohibited in the army or an integral part of the uniform.

In animals

The term "beard" is also used for a collection of stiff, hairlike feathers on the centre of the breast of turkeys. Normally, the turkey's beard remains flat and may be hidden under other feathers, but when the bird is displaying, the beard becomes erect and protrudes several centimetres from the breast.

Many goats possess a beard. The orangutan also possesses a beard.

Several animals are termed "bearded" as part of their common name. Sometimes a beard of hair on the chin or face is prominent but for some others, "beard" may refer to a pattern or colouring of the pelage reminiscent of a beard.
Bearded barbet
Bearded Collie
Bearded dragon
Bearded pig
Bearded reedling
Bearded saki
Bearded seal
Bearded vulture
Bearded woodpecker

See also
 List of facial hairstyles
 Barbatus (disambiguation), a common Latin name, meaning "bearded"
 Beard Liberation Front
 Joseph Palmer (communard) defended himself from being forcibly shaved in 1830
 The Beards (Australian band)
 World Beard and Moustache Championships
 Shaving

Notes

References

Further reading
 
 
 
 
  (reprinted 2014 by the British Library)
 
 
  (alternative title: Beards: an "omnium gatherum")

External links